Riot, Riot Upstart is the sixth full-length studio album from New York hardcore band Agnostic Front. It was released in September 1999 on Epitaph Records and follows Something's Gotta Give released the previous year. The album was produced by Lars Frederiksen of fellow punk band, Rancid, and the title track appeared on a volume of Epitaph Records' Punk-O-Rama compilation series.

Track listing

Personnel
Agnostic Front
 Roger Miret – vocals
 Vinnie Stigma – guitars
 Rob Kabula – bass
 Jim Colletti – drums
Production
 Recorded at Big Blue Meenie Studios, Jersey City, New Jersey
 Produced by Lars Frederiksen
 Engineered by Tim Gilles

Trivia

 The editing for the "Riot Riot Upstart" music video was done by the same editor who worked on the Brady Bunch title sequence. This explains the segregated screen effect which is used several times in the video.

References

External links
Epitaph Records album page
Agnostic Front official website

1999 albums
Agnostic Front albums